Mediterranean Rowing Club is a rowing club near the Port of Gibraltar, based at 4 Europort Road, Gibraltar. The boathouse is next door to the Calpe Rowing Club.

History
The Club was founded in 1899. It is one of two clubs from Gibraltar that compete regularly at the British Rowing Championships, the other being the Calpe Rowing Club. Both clubs are also affiliated to the Gibraltar Amateur Rowing Association which in turn became affiliated to FISA in 1984. The club has produced multiple national British champions.

Honours

National champions

References

Sport in Gibraltar